Battle of the Alma may refer to: 
 Battle of the Alma, a battle in the Crimean War in 1854.
 Battle of the Alma (Algeria), a battle in the Mokrani Revolt in 1871.